San Antonio FC is a professional soccer club based in San Antonio, Texas. It competes in the USL Championship, the second-highest level of the United States soccer league system, as a member of the Western Conference.

History 

San Antonio FC was awarded the thirty-first USL franchise on January 7, 2016. The establishment of the club, along with the concurrent purchase of Toyota Field by the City of San Antonio and Bexar County, was part of a plan by local officials to obtain an expansion franchise in Major League Soccer. As a result, the San Antonio Scorpions franchise of the North American Soccer League was shut down. The first head coach in club history was former Elon University men's soccer coach and Orlando City SC Pro Academy Director, Darren Powell. Carlos Alvarez was the club's first player signing on February 2, 2016.

After failing to make the playoffs in its inaugural season, San Antonio FC finished the 2017 USL regular season with a 17–11–4 (W-D-L) record, finishing second in the USL Western Conference standings and earning their first playoff berth in club history. SAFC advanced to the Western Conference semifinals before being eliminated. San Antonio failed to make the playoffs in consecutive years in 2018 and 2019 by a combined 4 points in the conference table.

San Antonio FC parted ways with head coach Darren Powell on October 30, 2019 after four seasons with the club. He accumulated an overall competition win-draw-loss record of 59–39–44. He led the club to its only playoff appearance in 2017, but failed to make the playoffs in the other three seasons under his management. His assistant coach, Alen Marcina, was named to replace Powell on December 9, 2019 in preparation for the 2020 USL Championship season. He led the former San Antonio Scorpions to their only NASL championship in the 2014 season. On October 20, 2021, Marcina led the club to their second consecutive post-season berth – the first back-to-back playoff appearance in club history. San Antonio would advance to the Western Conference Finals for the first time in club history, losing to eventual league champions Orange County SC in penalty kicks.

Marcina led the club back into the playoffs for a third consecutive time, part of the most successful season in club history. San Antonio captured five trophies in 2022; the Copa Tejas, Copa Tejas Shield, USLC regular season title, the Western Conference championship, and the USL Championship having beaten Louisville City FC 3-1 in the 2022 USL Championship Final.

Stadium 

 Toyota Field (2016–present), capacity 8,296

San Antonio plays its home matches at Toyota Field in San Antonio, Texas. Toyota Field is an 8,296-seat soccer-specific, natural grass stadium designed to be expandable to over 18,000 seats. Originally built for the former San Antonio Scorpions, the stadium was sold by its owner, Gordon Hartman, to the City of San Antonio and Bexar County in November 2015. San Antonio FC set a Toyota Field attendance record of 8,534 for the 2022 USL Championship Final, a 3-1 victory against Louisville City FC on November 13, 2022.

Crest and colors 

San Antonio's club colors are black and silver, showing strength and unity with the other SS&E franchises. Red is an accent color that is from the same red in the Texas state flag signifying the pride the club has in Texas.

The shape of San Antonio FC's badge was derived from a variety of traditional national and international club crests. The heart of the badge contains two prominent elements: the five diagonal stripes, which were inspired by the armed forces’ service stripes, are a salute to San Antonio’s rich military history and their upward movement signifies the club's goal to play at the highest level; and the rowel of the Spur symbolizes the direct link between San Antonio FC and its parent company, Spurs Sports & Entertainment. Binding all of the interior elements is a single "S”—a subtle nod to the hometown heritage and how it unites the community.

Kit manufacturers and sponsors

Culture

Affiliation 
San Antonio was designated as the USL affiliate of New York City FC for the 2017 season. As of 2019, there is no reported affiliation between San Antonio FC and New York City FC.

Supporters 
 The Crocketteers are the largest organized independent soccer supporters group based in San Antonio. The group was founded in March 2009 by Michael Macias.
 Mission City Firm is an independent football organization whose mission is to give 100% of their support to San Antonio FC. They are a very diverse group of individuals and "welcome any and all persons who share the same passion for the game and for what professional football here in San Antonio will do for our community."

Rivalries

Copa Tejas 

San Antonio FC shares in-state rivalries with two current USL Championship sides in Texas – El Paso Locomotive FC, Rio Grande Valley FC and formerly Austin Bold FC. Begun in the 2019 USL Championship season, all three teams participate in the Copa Tejas – a head-to-head competition during the USL regular season schedule. The team with the most points at the end of the season wins the trophy. San Antonio won its first Copa Tejas in 2022, going 3-1-0 against their opponents while also capturing the Copa Tejas Shield.

South Texas Derby 

Since 2016, the annual rivalry with Rio Grande Valley FC, who served as a hybrid affiliate of the Houston Dynamo of Major League Soccer from 2016 until 2020, is one of the most hotly contested matches in lower division US soccer. The two teams are located about 237 miles apart from each other in South Texas. Due to this proximity, the matches tend to draw well and often feature aggressive play for bragging rights.

Ownership  
The club is owned by Spurs Sports & Entertainment.

Players and staff

Current roster

For recent transfers, see 2023 San Antonio FC season.

Team management 
{|class="wikitable"
|-
! style="background:black; color:#c0c0c0;" scope="col" colspan="2"|Executive
|-

|-

|-

|-
|-
! style="background:black; color:#c0c0c0;" scope="col" colspan="2"|Staff

|-

|-

|-

|-

|-

|-

|-

Year-by-year 

1. Top scorer(s) includes all goals scored in league, league playoffs, U.S. Open Cup, CONCACAF Champions League, FIFA Club World Cup, and other competitive continental matches.

Head coaches 

 Includes league regular season, league playoffs, and U.S. Open Cup matches. Excludes friendlies.

Club captains

Honors 

USL Championship

USL Championship Final
 Champions (1): 2022

 Regular Season
 Champions (1): 2022
Western Conference
 Champions (Regular season) (1): 2022
Runners-up (Regular season) (1): 2017
Champions (Playoffs) (1): 2022
Runners-up (Playoffs) (1): 2021

Other
 Copa Tejas (Shield)
 Champions (1): 2022
 Runners-up (1): 2021
 Copa Tejas (Division 2)
 Champions (1): 2022
 Runners-up (1): 2019

Notes

References

External links
 

 
Association football clubs established in 2016
USL Championship teams
2016 establishments in Texas
Soccer clubs in Texas
Sports teams in San Antonio
Spurs Sports & Entertainment